Gruia is a commune located in Mehedinți County, Oltenia, Romania. It is composed of three villages: Gruia, Izvoarele and Poiana Gruii.

References

Communes in Mehedinți County
Localities in Oltenia
Populated places on the Danube